The Civilization of Maxwell Bright is a 2005 romance film, directed by David Beaird and starring Patrick Warburton, Marie Matiko, Eric Roberts, Leland Crooke, and Jennifer Tilly. The film's plot centers on a man who obtains a mail-order bride, with unexpected results. It has seen success on the arthouse movie circuit, winning awards at the WorldFest Houston, New York VisionFest, Florida Film Festival, Boulder International Film Festival, and Beverly Hills Film Festival.

Synopsis
After a series of bad relationships, the last one ending with his lover injuring him with a hoe while they argue on the street, fully nude, in view of the cops and his neighbors, Maxwell Bright resolves to find his fantasy woman: obedient and submissive. His dissolute friends goad him into ordering a mail-order bride from China.

Mai Ling, the Chinese bride, arrives after six weeks. She is perfect, and even makes Max's chaotic house into a welcoming home. However, he reacts by treating her like a prostitute, and humiliates her in front of his friends. At this point, Mai Ling reveals that she is really a Buddhist nun who took her sister's place. Max has an epiphany, recognizing Mai Ling as a deeply spiritual and moral woman.

The couple falls in love, and their relationship grows amid mutual respect. Mai Ling attempts to awaken Max's buddha-nature, and Max introduces Mai Ling to the luxuries of modern American living.

This comes to an abrupt end when Max, his finances failing after spending $100,000 on Mai Ling, discovers that he also has terminal cancer.  Mai Ling supports him and helps him prepare for death, and he comes at last to explore his spiritual side and make his peace with those he has harmed.

When Max dies, Mai Ling resumes her life as a nun.

Cast
Patrick Warburton as Maxwell Bright
Marie Lan Matiko as Mai Ling
Eric Roberts as Arliss
Leland Crooke as Buddy DeHare
Jennifer Tilly as Dr. O’Shannon
Simon Callow as Mr. Wroth
Kurt Fuller as Berdette
Terence Knox as Officer Riggs
Nora Dunn as Mary Jane
Carol Kane as Temple
John Glover as Ogden
Missi Pyle as Cop

References

External links
 
 

2005 films
2005 romantic drama films
Films about Buddhism
Films directed by David Beaird
American romantic drama films
2000s American films